The Armed Forces Bowl, formerly the Fort Worth Bowl from 2003 to 2005, is an annual postseason college football bowl game. First played in 2003, the game is normally held at the 45,000-seat Amon G. Carter Stadium on the campus of Texas Christian University in Fort Worth, Texas. The 2010 and 2011 editions were instead played at Gerald J. Ford Stadium in University Park, Texas, when Amon G. Carter Stadium underwent a reconstruction project. The game features teams from a variety of collegiate football conferences; in addition, the independent United States Military Academy (Army) is also eligible to participate. Since 2014, the game has been sponsored by Lockheed Martin and officially known as the Lockheed Martin Armed Forces Bowl. Previous sponsors include Bell Helicopter (2006–2013) and PlainsCapital Bank (2003–2004).

The contest is one of 14 bowls produced by ESPN Events (previously ESPN Regional Television) and has been televised annually on ESPN since its inception. Armed Forces Insurance is the official Insurance Partner of the Armed Forces Bowl and has sponsored the Great American Patriot Award, presented at halftime at the bowl, since 2006.

History
The bowl was first played in December 2003, featuring two ranked teams, No. 18 Boise State and No. 19 TCU. It was the only edition to include a ranked team (per the AP Poll) until No. 22 Army played in December 2018.

In 2010 and 2011 when Amon G. Carter Stadium underwent a reconstruction project, the bowl was moved to Gerald J. Ford Stadium in nearby University Park, Texas.

Through the December 2018 playing, one of the three FBS-playing service academies (Army, Navy, and Air Force) has appeared in the game ten times. Contractual tie-ins with the American Athletic Conference (home of Navy), the Mountain West Conference (home of Air Force) and independent Army assures that one of those schools could appear in the game every year, if bowl-eligible and not already committed to another bowl.

The 2018 game, between Army and Houston, was the first sellout in the bowl's 16-year history.

Sponsorship
The bowl game was inaugurated in 2003 as the PlainsCapital Fort Worth Bowl, reflecting the sponsorship of PlainsCapital Bank.  The bank's sponsorship ended after the 2004 edition, and the 2005 game was staged without corporate sponsorship.

In 2006, Fort Worth based Bell Helicopter Textron took over sponsorship, and thus the game became officially known as the Bell Helicopter Armed Forces Bowl. The Bell sponsorship ended after the 2013 edition. During this time, the 2010 and 2011 Armed Forces Bowl were held at Gerald J. Ford Stadium on the campus of Southern Methodist University in the Dallas enclave of University Park, while Amon G. Carter Stadium was undergoing a major renovation. The game returned to Amon Carter Stadium in Fort Worth in 2012, after construction on that stadium was completed.

Alltel was to assume the title sponsorship and naming rights to the game beginning in 2014, which would have been titled the Alltel Wireless Bowl to promote its mobile division, but the deal fell through. Instead, Lockheed Martin became the game's sponsor. The company has a major presence in the Dallas-Fort Worth Metroplex: the company's Lockheed Martin Aeronautics division is based in Fort Worth while its Lockheed Martin Missiles and Fire Control division is based in nearby Grand Prairie. In December 2018, Lockheed Martin extended its sponsorship though 2025.

Conference tie-ins
The bowl's partnership with the Big 12 Conference ended with the 2005 season. From 2006 to 2009, the Mountain West Conference was signed to provide a team to face either a team from the Pac-10 or Conference USA (C-USA), depending on the year; Pac-10 teams would play in odd number years while C-USA teams would play in even numbered years). As such, the 2006 and 2008 games featured C-USA teams Tulsa and Houston, respectively, whereas California represented the Pac-10 in 2007. The Pac-10 was unable to send a representative to the game in 2009, so C-USA sent Houston to the game for a second consecutive year. In 2010, since the Mountain West did not have enough eligible teams and Army was bowl eligible, Army played SMU in the bowl.

Following the 2013 football season, the Armed Forces Bowl signed multi-year agreements with the American Athletic Conference (The American), Big Ten Conference, Big 12 Conference, Mountain West Conference, Army and Navy to set bowl match-ups for the next six seasons (Navy would later join The American).

In December 2020, it was announced that the 2020 game would be played between teams from the Pac-12 and SEC, following cancellation of the ESPN Events-owned Las Vegas Bowl (which would have been featuring those tie-ins for the first time) due to complications relating to the COVID-19 pandemic. However, due to a lack of available teams from the Pac-12, Tulsa of the American Athletic Conference was ultimately selected to face Mississippi State of the SEC.

Games marked with an asterisk (*) were played in January of the following calendar year.

Game results

Rankings are based on the AP Poll prior to the game being played.

Source:

MVPs
An MVP is named from each team.

Source:

Most appearances

Updated through the December 2022 edition (20 games, 40 total appearances).

Teams with multiple appearances

Teams with a single appearance
Won (9): Boise State, BYU, Cincinnati, Kansas, Louisiana Tech, Mississippi State, Rice, Tulane, Utah

Lost (9): Baylor, Marshall, Middle Tennessee, Missouri, Pittsburgh, San Diego State, SMU, Southern Miss, TCU

Appearances by conference
Updated through the December 2022 edition (20 games, 40 total appearances).

 Games marked with an asterisk (*) were played in January of the following calendar year.
 Pac-12 record includes appearances when the conference was known as the Pac-10 (before 2011).
 The WAC no longer sponsors FBS football.
 Independent appearances: Army (2010, 2017, 2018, 2021), BYU (2011), Navy (2013)

Game records

Source:

Media coverage

The bowl has been televised on ESPN since its inception. Radio coverage was initially on ESPN Radio, and is currently carried nationally via Bowl Season Radio.

Notes

References

External links

 
College football bowls
Military competitions in American football
Recurring sporting events established in 2003